Cumberland Center is a census-designated place (CDP) within the town of Cumberland in Cumberland County, Maine, United States. The population was 2,499 at the 2010 census. It is part of the Portland – South Portland – Biddeford, Maine, Metropolitan Statistical Area.

Geography
Cumberland Center is located at  (43.796786, -70.249713).

Demographics

As of the census of 2000, there were 2,596 people, 891 households, and 744 families residing in the CDP. The racial makeup of the CDP was 99.00% White, 0.15% African American, 0.12% Native American, 0.42% Asian, 0.12% from other races, and 0.19% from two or more races. Hispanic or Latino of any race were 0.42% of the population.

There were 891 households, out of which 49.5% had children under the age of 18 living with them, 73.1% were married couples living together, 8.0% had a female householder with no husband present, and 16.4% were non-families. 14.0% of all households were made up of individuals, and 7.0% had someone living alone who was 65 years of age or older. The average household size was 2.91 and the average family size was 3.22.

In the CDP, the population was spread out, with 33.9% under the age of 18, 2.7% from 18 to 24, 29.2% from 25 to 44, 24.1% from 45 to 64, and 10.2% who were 65 years of age or older. The median age was 38 years. For every 100 females, there were 92.3 males. For every 100 females age 18 and over, there were 86.8 males.

The median income for a household in the CDP was $66,950, and the median income for a family was $72,632. Males had a median income of $47,975 versus $40,125 for females. The per capita income for the CDP was $32,043. About 2.3% of families and 2.0% of the population were below the poverty line, including 2.0% of those under age 18 and 4.2% of those age 65 or over.

School system
The Greely school system comprises five schools which teach grades K–12. Greely High School has a student body composed of 2001 students in grades 9–12.

References

Census-designated places in Cumberland County, Maine
Census-designated places in Maine
Portland metropolitan area, Maine